Until 1 January 2007 Sundsøre municipality was a municipality (Danish, kommune) in the former Viborg County on the Salling Peninsula, a part of the larger Jutland peninsula in northwest Denmark.  The municipality included the island of Fur, and covered an area of 171 km².  It had a total population of 6,464 (2005).  Its last mayor is Flemming Eskildsen, a member of the Venstre (Liberal Party) political party.

The main town and the site of its municipal council was the town of Breum.

To the north are the waters of the Limfjord, Fur Strait (Fur Sund), and Risgårde Bredning.  The former municipality's island of Fur is located north of the mainland in these waters.

Ferry service connects the former municipality near the town of Selde northwest over Fur Strait to the town of Stenøre on the island, and at the town of Sundsøre southeast over Hvalp Strait to the town of Hole.

Sundsøre municipality was, as the result of Kommunalreformen ("The Municipality Reform" of 2007), merged with existing Spøttrup, Sallingsund and Skive municipalities to form the new Skive municipality.  This created a municipality with an area of 682 km² and a total population of 48,368 (2005).  The new municipality belongs to the new Region Midtjylland ("Mid-Jutland Region").

External links

 Skive municipality's official website (Danish only)

References 
 Municipal statistics: NetBorger Kommunefakta, delivered from KMD aka Kommunedata (Municipal Data)
 Municipal mergers and neighbors: Eniro new municipalities map

Former municipalities of Denmark